Deep in the Heart may refer to:

"Deep in the Heart" (song), 1987 song by U2
Deep in the Heart (film),  2014 Chinese film

See also
Deep in My Heart (disambiguation)